Plaça de Mossèn Jacint Verdaguer (colloquially Plaça Verdaguer or simply Verdaguer) is a square in the Eixample district of Barcelona, Catalonia, Spain. It lies in the intersection between Avinguda Diagonal, the city's main avenue, and Passeig de Sant Joan, in Dreta de l'Eixample, not far from the Sagrada Família.

It is named after the 19th century Catalan-language epic poet Jacint Verdaguer, and is crowned by a noucentista monument made in 1912 by Joan Borrell of Verdaguer on top of a column and monumental construction designed by the architect Josep Maria Pericàs with Borrell's allegories of poetry. The bas-reliefs around the monument, featuring scenes from Verdaguer's works, particularly L'Atlàntida, were sculpted by the brothers Llucià and Miquel Oslé. The current Catalan name of the square was approved in 1980, merely changing it from the Spanish version: Jacinto Verdaguer.

Barcelona Metro
The Barcelona Metro station Verdaguer is immediately next to the square, and is served by lines L4 and L5.

See also
List of streets and squares in Eixample, Barcelona
Urban planning of Barcelona

References

Further reading

External links
Pobles de Catalunya.cat, a guide to the historical and artistic heritage of Catalonia
Pictures at Webshots.com
Fundació Jacint Verdaguer

Eixample
Plazas in Barcelona
Jacint Verdaguer
Avinguda Diagonal